The Blood are an English, London-based punk rock band, formed in 1982. Led by Cardinal Jesus Hate and JJ Bedsore (AKA Colin Smith and Jamie Cantwell), the band formed in the early 1980s under the name "Coming Blood". Their music is a blend of hardcore punk, Oi!, heavy metal, football chants and shock rock.

Many of their songs criticize religion or discuss political or philosophical topics.

Career
Their first single, "Megalomania", ridiculed the Pope. Doctor Wild Thing played drums on 'Megalomania'. Their second single release "Stark Raving Normal" (a double A side with Mesrine) criticized one-dimensional patriotism, apathy and mediocrity. The Cardinal calls himself a punk secular humanist. Their first album, False Gestures for a Devious Public featuring Evo (ex Angelic Upstarts, Warfare & Major Accident) on drums (1983), hit the UK top 30 and was voted one of the year's best releases by Sounds magazine. They used to be managed by Garry Bushell, and their song "Such Fun" was on the Oi! compilation album Oi! Oi! That's Yer Lot!. The album also included the song 'Mesrine' which was an anthem about the French iconoclastic gangster Jacques Mesrine. 'Mesrine' was released in 1983 which preceded the release of the film of the same name that was made in 1984. J.J. Bedsore died in 2004 of multiple organ failure due to years of chronic alcoholism.

On 10 December 2006, (International Human Rights Day) The Blood was reformed by the Cardinal and some of his friends to release the song, "Kill The Pimps", on the Eyeline Productions record label. The song criticizes governments that turn a blind eye to human trafficking. On 11 September 2007, The Blood released their first acoustic DVD, Samurai Lullaby, on the Eyeline Productions record label. The film footage on this DVD is taken from the tragedy of 9/11. On 1 June 2008, The Blood released an acoustic CD album punk@theopera. The concept album reveals the voyage of two young people who struggle to free themselves from human-trafficking pimps and a tyrannical religious cult. In 2010, The Blood's latest work came out, a self-penned album, by The Cardinal, @thebodysnatchersball.

On 8 June 2012, The Blood is reformed by The Cardinal, Chema Zurita a.k.a. 'Sonic Offender' and Jesus Ruiz. The new Spanish members of The Blood both grew up in the same town in Alicante. Chema Zurita also being a regular bass player with the Uk Subs. In December 2012 and throughout 2013 the band toured the East and West coast of US, Canada, France, Spain, and Japan bringing the early years anthems back to life as a tribute to The Cardinal and JJ Bedsore's work.

In March 2014, The Blood released "Chorus of Legends", an anthem composed for the World Cup in Brazil 2014. 

In August 2016, The Cardinal published Vagabond Vendetta, an autobiographical fantasy which is set in the Republic of Frestonia. In chapter eleven of the novel The Cardinal executes Jimmy Savile, Rolf Harris and Stuart Hall based on the historic evidence that Sex Pistol, Johnny Rotten gave to the BBC in 1978.

Band members

1983
Cardinal Jesus Hate - vocals
JJ Bedsore - guitar
Muttley  - bass
Frankie Flame - Keyboards
Evo - Drums

1985
Cardinal Jesus Hate - vocals
JJ Bedsore - guitar
Micky James - Bass
Mark Mitchell - Drums
Phil Butcher Taylor - Keyboards

1995
JJ Bedsore - Lead Vocals, Guitar
Gaz - Lead Vocals, Bass
Gareth a.k.a. Elvis Christ - Guitar, Backing Vocals
Shane Atlas - Drums
Cardinal Smith - vocals on studio track "You Kill My Head Out"

1996
JJ Bedsore - Lead Vocals, Guitar
Gaz - Lead Vocals, Bass
Gareth a.k.a. Elvis Christ - Guitar, Backing Vocals
Mark Hannan/Blitz/Shane Atlas - Drums

1999
JJ Bedsore - Lead Vocals, Guitar
Gaz - Lead Vocals, Bass
Gareth a.k.a. Elvis Christ - Guitar, Backing Vocals
Brad Sims - Drums

2006
The Cardinal - Lead Vocals, Guitar
Richard "Orible" Hogben - Drums
Monty-Mutent The Merciful - Vocals, Keyboards
Dave Shit - Bass

2007
The Cardinal - Lead Vocals, Guitar
The Hammond Summers - Hammond Organ, Piano, Accordion
Nick Pilton - Backing Vocals

2012
The Cardinal - Lead Vocals
JeSus the Atheist - Guitar / Vocals
Eve of Destruction - Vocals / Keyboard
Sonic Offender - Bass
Pablo Veliz - Drums

Discography
Chart placings shown are from the UK Indie Chart.

Albums
False Gestures for a Devious Public (1983), Noise - No. 5 (reissued 2005, Captain Oi!)
Se Parare Nex (1985)
Smell Yourself(1995) (CD, LP and single, Blind Beggar)
Spillage (1998) (CD, SolidInc)
Split Live (w/ Dizzy Dizzy) (recorded 1999, released 2004) (CD, DSI Records)
punk@theopera (2008) - self-penned CD by the Cardinal
@thebodysnatchersball (2010)

Singles and EPs
Megalomania EP (1983) - No. 6
"Stark Raving Normal" (1983) - No. 20
Fabulous as Usual EP (1996)
"Boots" (1997)
"Kill the Pimps"

Compilation appearances
"Such Fun" (on Oi! Oi! That's Yer Lot)
"Stark Raving Normal" (on Oi Fuckin' Oi)
"Incubus" (on Metal Inferno)

References

External links
The Blood
The Blood tribute website
Article about The Blood
History of Oi! that mentions The Blood
Chapter on Oi! that mentions The Blood
The Blood Interview, Punk & Oi in the UK

English punk rock groups
English indie rock groups
Musical groups from London
Oi! groups
Media and communications in the Royal Borough of Greenwich